The proposed Citizenship Reform Act of 2005 was a bill which, if enacted into law, would have amended the Immigration and Nationality Act to limit automatic citizenship at birth to apply only to a child born in the United States who: (1) was born in wedlock to parents either of whom was then a U.S. citizen or national or an alien lawfully admitted for permanent residence who maintained such residence; or (2) was born out of wedlock to a mother who was then a U.S. citizen or national or an alien lawfully admitted for permanent residence who maintained such residence.  
The bill would have accomplished this objective by defining children not falling into the above categories as not being "subject to the jurisdiction" of the United States, and thus not entitled to automatic citizenship via the Fourteenth Amendment which section 1 reads "All persons born or naturalized in the United States, and subject to the jurisdiction thereof, are citizens of the United States and of the State wherein they reside. No State shall make or enforce any law which shall abridge the privileges or immunities of citizens of the United States; nor shall any State deprive any person of life, liberty, or property, without due process of law; nor deny to any person within its jurisdiction the equal protection of the laws."

In the Slaughter-House Cases,  — a civil rights case not dealing specifically with birthright citizenship — a Supreme Court majority mentioned in passing that "the phrase 'subject to its jurisdiction' was intended to exclude from its operation children of ministers, consuls, and citizens or subjects of foreign States born within the United States" 
     
H.R. 698 was introduced in early 2005, was referred to the House Subcommittee on Immigration, Border Security, and Claims, but saw no subsequent action and died when the 109th Congress adjourned sine die on December 9, 2006.

Whether a bill such as the Citizenship Reform Act of 2005 would manage to accomplish its intended purpose, even if it were to be enacted into law by Congress, is unclear.  In a 1982 case, Plyler v. Doe, the Supreme Court rejected the suggestion that illegal immigrants to the United States might not be "subject to the jurisdiction" of the United States within the meaning of the Fourteenth Amendment.  If a future Supreme Court were to rule similarly to the Plyler court, this would likely mean that the sort of change envisioned by the Citizenship Reform Act of 2005 could be accomplished only via an amendment to the Constitution.

References

United States proposed federal immigration and nationality legislation
Proposed legislation of the 109th United States Congress
Citizenship of the United States